Massaly may refer to:
Masally Rayon, Azerbaijan
Masallı, Azerbaijan, capital of the rayon
Musaly, Sabirabad, Azerbaijan